L. Balaraman (4 January 1932 – 26 February 2002) was an Indian politician and Member of Parliament elected from Tamil Nadu. He was elected to the Lok Sabha from the Vandavasi constituency as an Indian National Congress candidate in 1984 and 1989 elections, and as a Tamil Maanila Congress (Moopanar) candidate in 1996 election.

He was born in Mottupalayam Village in Vellore District. It is nearby Vellore City. He was the grandson of Mr. Varadha Gounder, who was the landlord in the village.

He also served as the Member of the Legislative Assembly of Tamil Nadu. He was elected to the Tamil Nadu legislative assembly from Kamiyambadi constituency as an Indian National Congress candidate in 1967 election and from Polur constituency as an Indian National Congress (I) candidate in 1980 election.

Balaraman died on 26 February 2002 in Vellore.

References 

Tamil Nadu politicians
1932 births
2002 deaths
India MPs 1984–1989
India MPs 1989–1991
India MPs 1996–1997
Lok Sabha members from Tamil Nadu
Tamil Maanila Congress politicians
Indian National Congress politicians
People from Tiruvannamalai district
Indian National Congress politicians from Tamil Nadu